The 2015 Fort Lauderdale Strikers season will be the team's fifth season in the North American Soccer League (NASL).

Players and staff

Current roster

Staff
  Ricardo Geromel – Managing Partner
  Amaury Nunes – General Manager
  Günter Kronsteiner – Head Coach
  Raoul Voss – Assistant Coach
  Iván Guerrero – Player/Assistant Coach
  Gustavo Alencar – Assistant Coach

Competitions

Friendlies

NASL Spring season

Standings

Results summary

Results by round

Match reports

NASL Fall season

Standings

Results summary

Results by round

Match reports

U.S. Open Cup 

The Strikers will compete in the 2015 edition of the Open Cup.

References

Fort Lauderdale Strikers
Fort Lauderdale Strikers seasons
Fort Lauderdale Strikers
Fort Lauderdale Strikers